I, Daniel Blake is a 2016 drama film written by Paul Laverty and directed by Ken Loach. The film stars Dave Johns as Daniel Blake, a middle-aged man who is denied Employment and Support Allowance despite being declared unfit to work by his doctor. Hayley Squires co-stars as Katie, a struggling single mother whom Daniel befriends.

I, Daniel Blake won the Palme d'Or at the 2016 Cannes Film Festival, the Prix du public at the 2016 Locarno International Film Festival, and the 2017 BAFTA Award for Outstanding British Film.

Plot
Daniel Blake, a widowed 59-year-old joiner from Newcastle, has had a heart attack. Though his doctor has not allowed him to return to work, he is deemed fit to do so after a Work Capability Assessment and is denied Employment and Support Allowance. Daniel is frustrated to learn that his doctor was not contacted about this decision and thus applies for an appeal, a process Daniel finds difficult because he must complete forms online and is not computer literate.

Daniel befriends Katie Morgan, a single mother, after she is sanctioned for arriving late to her Jobcentre appointment. Katie and her children have just moved to Newcastle from a homeless shelter in London, as there is no affordable accommodation in London. Daniel helps the family by repairing objects, teaching them how to heat rooms without electricity, and crafting wooden toys for the children.

During a food bank visit, Katie breaks down crying, having become overwhelmed by hunger due to feeding her children instead of herself. After she is caught shoplifting at a supermarket, a security guard secretly offers Katie work as a prostitute. Daniel surprises her at the brothel where she goes to work and begs her to give up the job, but Katie tearfully insists she has no other way to feed her children.

As a condition for receiving Jobseeker's Allowance, Daniel must keep looking for work. He refuses a job at a garden centre because his doctor will not allow him to work yet. When his work coach tells him he must work harder to find a job or be sanctioned, Daniel spraypaints "I, Daniel Blake, demand my appeal date before I starve" on the side of the building. 

Daniel earns the support of bystanders, including other people claiming benefits, but is arrested and cautioned by the police. Daniel sells most of his belongings and becomes a recluse but is pulled out of his depression by Katie's daughter, Daisy, who brings him a homemade meal to repay Daniel for his kindness. On the day of Daniel's appeal, Katie accompanies him to the tribunal, where a welfare adviser tells Daniel that his case looks promising. Upon seeing the judge and doctor who will decide his fate, Daniel becomes anxious and excuses himself to use the toilet, where he suffers another heart attack and dies. 

Later, Katie reads an eulogy at his public health funeral, including a speech he had intended to read at his appeal. The speech describes his feelings about how the welfare system failed him, and states, "I am not a blip on a computer screen or a national insurance number, I am a man."

Cast
 Dave Johns as Daniel Blake
 Hayley Squires as Katie Morgan
 Briana Shann as Daisy Morgan
 Dylan McKiernan as Dylan Morgan
 Kate Rutter as Ann
 Sharon Percy as Sheila
 Kema Sikazwe as China
 Steven Richens as Piper
 Gavin Webster as Joe
 Mick Laffey as Welfare Benefits Advisor

Production
Principal photography began in October 2015 in Newcastle upon Tyne and the surrounding area. The film was produced by Rebecca O'Brien for Sixteen Films, Why Not Productions and Wild Bunch with the support of the British Film Institute and BBC Films. 

O'Brien initially approached Channel 4's film division for funding. After a delay, O'Brien said she was told by Channel 4 that funding was not available as "we're already covering the area because we're doing Benefits Street".

Marketing 
I, Daniel Blake used a variety of marketing strategies to make sure Ken Loach's points got across to his targeted audience and that the film reached a wider audience, including disruptive marketing, street displays and newspaper inclusions. Ken Loach worked with the Trinity Mirror through the use of the editorial column of The Mirror and each newspaper had the "I" changed to reflect the main font of the film. 

The Trinity Mirror also provided 10,000 free tickets to see the movie as announced in one of their newspapers and used Daniel Blake as the masthead for its papers. The House of Commons and other major buildings in London had projections of Daniel Blake's end speech placed onto the outside walls as part of its "Guerrilla Marketing Campaign". 

Ken Loach retweeted various tweets promoting the film and even started a hashtag #WeAreAllDanielBlake which can mostly be found on the official I, Daniel Blake Twitter page.

Reception
I, Daniel Blake is Loach's biggest success at the UK box office. On the review aggregator website Rotten Tomatoes, the film has an approval rating of 92%, based on 184 reviews, with an average rating of 8.01/10. The site's consensus reads: "I, Daniel Blake marks yet another well-told chapter in director Ken Loach's powerfully populist filmography." On Metacritic, the film has a score of 78 out of 100, based on 31 critics, indicating "generally favourable reviews".

Writing for The Guardian, Mark Kermode gave the film five stars.

Legacy
In 2017, Dave Johns took a solo show to the Edinburgh Fringe: I, Filum Star chronicled how John's life had changed since the success of the film, and received critical acclaim, playing to sold out rooms throughout the run. In 2019, he toured a new show, From Byker to the BAFTAs, with 24 dates from August until November.

A stand-up comedy show titled I, Tom Mayhew was performed at the Edinburgh Fringe in August 2019. The stand-up comedian Tom Mayhew had previously been on benefits for over three years in austerity Britain and was inspired to write the show after watching the film. The show was critically acclaimed, with it transferring to a sold-out run at the Soho Theatre in January 2020.

The film’s star, Dave Johns, wrote a stage version updated to the 2021/2022 cost of living crisis which will be premiered  at the Northern Stage, Newcastle upon Tyne in May 2023.

Political response
The Conservative Party's then-Secretary of State for Work and Pensions, Iain Duncan Smith, said the film was unfair and criticised its portrayal of Jobcentre staff: "This idea that everybody is out to crunch you, I think it has really hurt Jobcentre staff who don't see themselves as that." The producer, Rebecca O'Brien, responded that Duncan Smith "is living in cloud cuckoo land".

On the 27 October 2016 episode of the BBC topical debate programme Question Time, which had Loach as a panellist, the Conservative Party's then-Business Secretary Greg Clark described the film as "fictional" and said, "It's a difficult job administering a benefits system. Department of Work and Pensions staff have to make incredibly difficult decisions and I think they should have our support in making those decisions." 

Loach responded by criticising the pressure that DWP staff are placed under: "We talked to hundreds of people who work at the DWP under your guidance and instructions, and they are told to sanction people. If they don't sanction them, they're in trouble." He later said, "When you're sanctioned your life is forced into chaos, and people are going to food banks. How can we live in a society where hunger is used as a weapon?"

The Labour Party's then-Leader, Jeremy Corbyn, appeared at the film's London premiere and praised the film on his Facebook page. During Prime Minister's Questions on 2 November 2016, Corbyn criticised the unfairness of the welfare system and advised then-Prime Minister, Theresa May, to watch the film.

Accolades

References

External links
 
 "I, Daniel Blake: An Authentic Cinema": an essay by Girish Shambu at the Criterion Collection
 I, Daniel Blake: Marketing Blog
 I, Daniel Blake Twitter page

2016 films
British Film Institute films
BBC Film films
France 2 Cinéma films
British drama films
English-language French films
French drama films
Social realism in film
Best British Film BAFTA Award winners
Best Foreign Film César Award winners
Palme d'Or winners
Films directed by Ken Loach
Films scored by George Fenton
Welfare in England
Films about poverty in the United Kingdom
Films set in Newcastle upon Tyne
IFC Films films
2016 drama films
2010s English-language films
2010s British films
2010s French films